Menara (official name, pronounced Menará), popularly known as Manara, is a kibbutz in northern Israel.

History
The village was formerly inhabited by Arabs, when it was known as Kh el Menarah.  In 1881, the PEF's Survey of Western Palestine (SWP)  described it as "ruins of a modern Arab village, several rock-cut cisterns, and one wine-press"

2538 dunams of land were purchased by the Jewish National Fund from an absentee landlord, Asa'ad Bey Khuri of Beirut at an unknown date.

The kibbutz was established in 1943 by members of the HaNoar HaOved VeHaLomed youth group, and other young immigrants from Germany and Poland. At one point the kibbutz was renamed Ramim (lit. Tall ones) in an attempt to replace its Arabic name (Manara derives from minaret) with a Hebrew one. However, the new name failed to take hold amongst local residents. The kibbutz then came to a settlement with the government whereby the name Menara, with an accent on the last syllable (a Hebraicized form of Manara, accented on the second syllable) would be made official.

In June, 1948, the kibbutz requested land from the newly  depopulated Palestinian village of Qadas, as it was "suitable for winter crops."

Leon Uris visited the kibbutz while researching his novel, Exodus. Former Prime Minister Yitzhak Rabin's sister Rachel Ya'akov was a founding member.

As Manara lies less than 100 metres from the Lebanese border, problems have arisen during fighting between the two countries. The Menara bypass project was completed in 2005 to provide safe access to the kibbutz.

Manara is boasted to be 888 metres above sea level and is a rare style for a kibbutz, with apartments providing the accommodation, due to the limited space.

Economy
Manara's main industries are agriculture (primarily cotton fields, apples and chickens), tourism to the scenic cliffs via its cable cars descending from the Upper Manara Cliff down to Kiryat Shmona in the valley below, and a technical glass manufacturing plant.

Notable people
 Rachel Rabin-Yaakov, sister of Yitzhak Rabin

See also
Recanati winery

References

Bibliography

External links
 
Manara cable car website 
Survey of Western Palestine, Map 2:   IAA, Wikimedia commons

Kibbutzim
Kibbutz Movement
Populated places established in 1943
Populated places in Northern District (Israel)
1943 establishments in Mandatory Palestine
German-Jewish culture in Israel
Polish-Jewish culture in Israel